A hundi is a collection box used in Indian temples to collect cash offerings from devotees.  During the 2016 demonetisation of high-value Indian banknotes, there were concerns that the discontinued Rs 500 and Rs 1,000 notes could be hidden in hundis, where monitoring isn't as stringent.

References

Religious objects
Indian culture